Uranovo (Uran) is a rural locality (a village) in Karansky Selsoviet, Buzdyaksky District, Bashkortostan, Russia. The population was 419 as of 2010. There are 6 streets.

Geography 
Uranovo is located 19 km north of Buzdyak (the district's administrative centre) by road. Karan is the nearest rural locality.

References 

Rural localities in Buzdyaksky District